Järva-Jaani is a borough in Järva County, in Järva Parish, central Estonia. It was the administrative center of Järva-Jaani Parish.

Notable people
 Eduard von Gebhardt (1838–1925), painter, was born in Järva-Jaani

References

External links
 Järva-Jaani Parish 

Boroughs and small boroughs in Estonia
Kreis Jerwen